The Episcopal Diocese of Connecticut (also known as The Episcopal Church in Connecticut) is a diocese of the Episcopal Church in the United States of America, encompassing the entire state of Connecticut. It is one of the nine original dioceses of the Episcopal Church and one of seven New England dioceses that make up Province 1.

Overview
Anglican services have been conducted in Connecticut since 1702. The diocese was established on 22 June 1785 following the American Revolution, and is one of the nine original dioceses of the Episcopal Church. The inaugural diocesan bishop was the Rt. Rev. Samuel Seabury, the first Anglican bishop with a see outside the British Isles; he also served as Presiding Bishop of the Church. 

Later bishops included the Rt. Rev. Walter H. Gray, who was also the first chair of the Civil Rights Commission in Connecticut and played a leading role in two meetings of the Lambeth Conference. The Most Rev. Desmond Tutu, Archbishop Emeritus of Cape Town, preached at the consecration of the 15th Bishop of Connecticut, the Rt. Rev. Ian Douglas, in 2010. Douglas was assisted by the Rt. Rev. Laura J. Ahrens as suffragan, the first woman to be elected bishop in Connecticut. The Rt. Rev. Jeffrey Mello succeeded Douglas as the 16th Bishop of Connecticut in 2022.

The bishop's cathedra is situated at Christ Church Cathedral in Hartford, and the diocesan offices are located in Meriden. 

As of 2021 the diocese had a membership of approximately 40,000, down from 68,000 in 2003.

List of bishops

Churches

The diocese is divided into six geographical areas known as regions. As of 2022, the there were approximately 190 places of worship in the diocese.

Northwest region

North central region

Northeast region

Southwest region

South central region

Southeast region

See also

List of Episcopal bishops

References

External links
Official Web site of the Episcopal Church in Connecticut
Christ Church Cathedral, Hartford, Connecticut
Official Web site of the Episcopal Church
Journal of the Annual Convention, Diocese of Connecticut at the Online Books Page

Episcopal Church in Connecticut
Connecticut
Connecticut
 
Province 1 of the Episcopal Church (United States)
Religious organizations established in 1784